.hu is the Internet country code top-level domain (ccTLD) for Hungary. Registrations are processed via accredited registrars.

Second-level domain names

 .2000.hu
 .agrar.hu
 .bolt.hu
 .city.hu
 .co.hu
 .edu.hu
 .film.hu
 .forum.hu
 .games.hu
 .gov.hu
 .hotel.hu
 .info.hu
 .ingatlan.hu
 .jogasz.hu
 .konyvelo.hu
 .lakas.hu
 .media.hu
 .mobi.hu
 .net.hu
 .news.hu
 .org.hu
 .priv.hu
 .reklam.hu
 .shop.hu
 .sport.hu
 .suli.hu
 .tm.hu
 .tozsde.hu
 .utazas.hu
 .video.hu
 .casino.hu
 .erotica.hu
 .erotika.hu
 .sex.hu
 .szex.hu

References

External links
 IANA .hu whois information
 Hungarian NIC
 List of .hu accredited registrars
 List of .hu SLDs 

Country code top-level domains
Communications in Hungary
Mass media in Hungary
Council of European National Top Level Domain Registries members

sv:Toppdomän#H